PACF may refer to:

Partial autocorrelation function - a type of Mathematical Function.
Princeton Area Community Foundation -  a public charity based in Lawrenceville, NJ serving Central Jersey through scholarships, awards, grants, and other philanthropic support.